The Tupinier Islands are a group of pyramid-shaped islands lying off the north coast of Trinity Peninsula, about  west of Cape Ducorps. They were discovered by the French expedition under Captain Jules Dumont d'Urville, 1837–40, and named after Baron Tupinier (1779–1850), an official of the French Naval Ministry who was instrumental in obtaining government support for the expedition. The islands were recharted by the Falkland Islands Dependencies Survey (FIDS) in 1946.

Important Bird Area
The island group has been designated an Important Bird Area (IBA) by BirdLife International because it supports a large breeding colony of about 14,000 pairs of chinstrap penguins.  Imperial shags also nest at the site.

See also 
 List of Antarctic and Subantarctic islands
 Molina Rocks, 4 nautical miles (7 km) west of the Tupinier Islands

References

External links

Islands of Trinity Peninsula
Important Bird Areas of Antarctica
Seabird colonies
Penguin colonies